Cinco Olivas is a municipality located in the province of Zaragoza, Aragon, Spain. According to the 2009 census (INE), the municipality has a population of 118 inhabitants.

See also
Ribera Baja del Ebro

References

External links 

 Comarca de Ribera Baja del Ebro - Official website

Municipalities in the Province of Zaragoza